The third season of The Great American Baking Show aired on December 7, 2017 with a two-hour premiere on ABC. The first two episodes aired back-to-back as part of ABC's 25 Days of Christmas lineup before being pulled by ABC on December 13, 2017 following sexual misconduct allegations against judge Johnny Iuzzini.

This is the first season for new hosts Ayesha Curry and Anthony "Spice" Adams along with The Great British Bake Off judge, Paul Hollywood, who joined judge Johnny Iuzzini. Season two baker, Antoinette Love, who withdrew from the competition following her father's death, returned to the competition. The show was filmed in Iver Heath, UK over a three-week time period. The shooting sequence was two days of filming followed by one day break during those three weeks.

On December 21, 2017, the day in which the finale was originally to air, ABC announced that Vallery Lomas won the competition, beating out runners-up Cindy Maliniak and Molly Brodak in the final week. Lomas' winning dish was a three pastry/dessert tower.

Bakers

Results summary

Color key:

 The Star Baker and elimination results for episodes 3, 4 and 5 were released on the show's official Facebook page and ABC's YouTube.
 ABC announced the winner and runners-up in a season recap posted the day the finale was to be broadcast.

Episodes

Episode 1: Cake
For the first signature bake, the bakers were given two hours to bake a "naked" cake, a cake that is not entirely covered in icing. The technical bake, assigned by Paul Hollywood, required the bakers to create nine identical lamingtons covered with a white chocolate coating and coconut flakes. In the showstopper, bakers had two hours and thirty minutes to bake a decorative holiday Swiss roll with an evenly distributed spiral filling.

Color key:

Episode 2: Morning Treats
In the show's first morning treats week, the bakers had two hours and thirty minutes to either bake or fry one dozen yeasted donuts complete with a filling of their choice. For the technical, bakers created eight identical savory breakfast hand pies with distinct flaky layers and an even filling. The showstopper of the week required bakers to make a centerpiece sweet loaf with a distinct spiral on the inside.

Unaired episodes
Highlights from the unaired desserts week and cookies week were released on the show's official Facebook page and ABC's YouTube channel on December 29, 2017. French week and finals week followed on January 2, 2018.

Dessert

Cookies

French (Semi-Finals)

Final

Ratings

References

External links

3
2017 American television seasons